Apache cTAKES: clinical Text Analysis and Knowledge Extraction System is an open-source Natural Language Processing (NLP) system that extracts clinical information from electronic health record unstructured text. It processes clinical notes, identifying types of clinical named entities — drugs, diseases/disorders, signs/symptoms, anatomical sites and procedures. Each named entity has attributes for the text span, the ontology mapping code, context (family history of, current, unrelated to patient), and negated/not negated.

cTAKES was built using the  UIMA Unstructured Information Management Architecture framework and OpenNLP natural language processing toolkit.

Components  
Components of cTAKES are specifically trained for the clinical domain, and create rich linguistic and semantic annotations that can be utilized by clinical decision support systems and clinical research.

These components include:
 Named Section identifier
 Sentence boundary detector
 Rule-based tokenizer
 Formatted list identifier
 Normalizer
 Context dependent tokenizer
 Part-of-speech tagger
 Phrasal chunker
 Dictionary lookup annotator
 Context annotator
 Negation detector
 Uncertainty detector
 Subject detector
 Dependency parser
 patient smoking status identifier
 Drug mention annotator

History 
Development of cTAKES began at the Mayo Clinic in 2006. The development team, led by Dr. Guergana Savova and Dr. Christopher Chute, included physicians, computer scientists and software engineers. After its deployment, cTAKES became an integral part of Mayo's clinical data management infrastructure, processing more than 80 million clinical notes.

When Dr. Savova's moved to Boston Children's Hospital in early 2010, the core development team grew to include members there. Further external collaborations include:
 University of Colorado
 Brandeis University
 University of Pittsburgh
 University of California at San Diego
Such collaborations have extended cTAKES' capabilities into other areas such as Temporal Reasoning, Clinical Question Answering, and coreference resolution for the clinical domain.

In 2010, cTAKES was adopted by the i2b2 program and is a central component of the SHARP Area 4.

In 2013, cTAKES released their first release as an Apache incubator project: cTAKES 3.0.

In March 2013, cTAKES became an Apache Top Level Project (TLP).

See also 
 OpenNLP
 UIMA
 Electronic Health Record
 Unified Medical Language System

References

External links 
 cTAKES Official Website
 Apache cTAKES Project Information page from ASF
 Abstract (JAMIA)
 Open Health Natural Language Processing (OHNLP) Consortium
 Strategic Health IT Advanced Research Projects (SHARP) Program
 SHARP Area 4 - Secondary Use of EHR Data
 The Automated Retrieval Console (ARC)
 Health Information Text Extraction (HITEx)) was developed as part of the i2b2 project. It is a rule-based NLP pipeline based on the GATE framework developed by Informatics for Integrating Biology and the Bedside.
 Computational Language and Education Research toolkit (cleartk) (No longer maintained) has been developed at the University of Colorado at Boulder, and provides a framework for developing statistical NLP components in Java. It is built on top of Apache UIMA.
 NegEx - is a tool developed at the University of Pittsburgh to detect negated terms from clinical text. The system utilizes trigger terms as a method to determine likely negation scenarios within a sentence. 
 ConText): an extension to NegEx, and is also developed by the University of Pittsburgh. ConText extends NegEx to not only detect negated concepts, but to also find temporal (recent, historical or hypothetical scenarios) and who the Subject (of experience) is (patient or other).
 MetaMap (by United States National Library of Medicine): is a comprehensive concept tagging system which is built on top of the Unified Medical Language System. It requires an active UMLS Metathesaurus License Agreement (and account) for use. 
 MedEx - a tool for extraction medication information from clinical text. MedEx processes free-text clinical records to recognize medication names and signature information, such as drug dose, frequency, route, and duration. Use is free with a UMLS license. It is a standalone application for Linux and Windows. 
 SecTag (section tagging hierarchy): recognizes note section headers using NLP, Bayesian, spelling correction, and scoring techniques. Use is free with either a UMLS or LOINC license. 
 (Stanford Named Entity Recognizer (NER)): Stanford’s NER is a Conditional Random Field sequence model, together with well-engineered features for Named Entity Recognition in English and German. 
 (Stanford CoreNLP) is an integrated suite of natural language processing tools for English in Java, including tokenization, part-of-speech tagging, named entity recognition, parsing, and coreference.

cTAKES
Electronic health record software
Natural language processing software
Free health care software
Free bioinformatics software